Chay Fihaki (born 1 January 2001, in New Zealand) is a New Zealand rugby union player who plays for the  in the Mitre 10 Cup. His preferred playing position is centre, wing or fullback. Fihaki attended Sacred Heart College in Auckland, where he was in the 1st XV, which he captained in his final year . He has signed for Canterbury squad in 2020.

Reference list

External links
 
Ultimate Rugby profile

2001 births
New Zealand rugby union players
Living people
Rugby union centres
Crusaders (rugby union) players
Rugby union wings
Rugby union fullbacks
New Zealand people of Fijian descent
Canterbury rugby union players
Rugby union players from Auckland